Catriona is a Scottish Gaelic given name.

Catriona may also refer to:

 Catriona (novel), by Robert Louis Stevenson
 Catriona (Monarch of the Glen), character in the TV series
 1116 Catriona, an asteroid
 Catriona (gastropod), a genus of aeolid nudibranchs (sea slugs)
 , a Caledonian MacBrayne ferry